The Men's 100 metres T42 event at the 2012 Summer Paralympics took place at the London Olympic Stadium on 7 September.

Records
Prior to the competition, the existing World and Paralympic records were as follows.

Results

Round 1
Competed 7 September 2012 from 10:15. Qual. rule: First 3 in each heat (Q) plus the 2 fastest other times (q) qualified.

Heat 1

Heat 2

Final
Competed 7 September 2012 at 21:25.

 
Q = qualified by place. q = qualified by time. RR = Regional Record. PB = Personal Best. SB = Seasonal Best.

References

Athletics at the 2012 Summer Paralympics
2012 in men's athletics